"For the Future" is the second and penultimate episode of the third season of the American animated television series The Owl House, and the 42nd overall episode of the series. In the episode, Luz Noceda's group heads back to the Boiling Isles, now changed from the last time they have visited. On two separate journeys, Luz and Belos hope to battle the Collector, with both suffering battles along the way.

The episode premiered on January 21, 2023 on both Disney Channel and Disney XD, and garnered a combined total of 442,000 viewers on its premiere. It received praise for its writing, use of time, character development, and emotional themes.

Plot 
Continuing from the events of "King's Tide" in the Boiling Isles, King Clawthorne tries to explain to the Collector the rules of "Owl House". Lilith Clawthorne and Hooty try to save King, but are turned into puppets for the Collector to play with in the Archive House, his newly built house. Lilith's sister and King's adoptive mother Eda Clawthorne transforms into her harpy form to confront the Collector.

Months later, continuing from the events of "Thanks to Them", Luz Noceda wakes up in-between realms, where she notices a winged figure waving at her from above just before she is pulled by her girlfriend, Amity Blight, into the Demon Realm. Both accompanied by their friends Willow, Gus, and Hunter, along with Luz's mother, Camila, discover that the Boiling Isles have changed in major ways since they last left, having become cartoonishly cute, filled with vivid colors and cute objects. Luz and the group decide to head to the Owl House. Meanwhile, Belos is also in the Demon Realm, suffering anxiety attacks caused by killing his brother, Caleb.

Luz's group eventually arrives at the Owl House, now completely abandoned and desecrated. Camila talks to Gus and Willow about Luz's worries of wanting to make amends to her mother, with Luz wanting to stay in the Human Realm permanently to do so, and talks with Willow about her bottling up her emotions, which Willow denies. Meanwhile, Hunter suffers PTSD-like symptoms from his palisman, Flapjack, dying. In Eda's room, Luz worries about her palisman not hatching, but Amity eventually comes in and tells her to be patient.

Hunter notices a shooting star carrying the Collector and King, so the group flies to the now abandoned Bonesborough, where the Collector has turned it into a playground to play with his puppets. After a round of playing, the Collector and King fly off to get Eda, the only citizen the Collector wants that has not turned into a puppet. Afterwards, Luz's group spots a group of friends from Hexside Academy, Luz's former school, and the group decide to go there, where they find out that the Collector had turned the teachers into his puppets, and, with the students being the only ones remaining, they decided to make a makeshift community with Boscha as their president, to most of the community's dismay due to her reputation as a spoiled, rich socialite with a disdain for considering any of the student's ideas to help the makeshift community.

At the same time, Belos is limping and visibly injured. He heads to his old hideout spot, suffering hallucinations of old memories and Grimwalkers he used to know, namely Caleb and past Golden Guards. He eventually makes it, finds an unfinished Grimwalker, and decides to kill it and absorb it, letting himself heal. At the Archive House, King and the Collector talk to Odalia Blight, Amity's mother, who has now become a servant for the Collector. After reading the Collector a bedtime story, King takes Hooty off Odalia's hands and heads over to the room where the puppets of the Coven Heads are held, finding Eda pretending to be a puppet so she could be with the puppet of Raine Whispers, and reminding her that the Collector still believes her to be stuck in her Owl Beast form. The two meet with Lilith, who prepares the elixirs that keep Eda out of her beast form, and she is able to reunite with Hooty, who still possesses some consciousness as a puppet.

At Hexside, one of Luz's school friends, Mattholomule, whose name is revealed to actually be Matt Tholomule, decides to sneak Luz's group into a magic photo classroom, where they hope to extract memories from Luz, specifically where she was when Belos used his teleportation spell into the skull of the Titan, hoping to reach the Archive House. Willow gives Hunter a picture of him and Flapjack together and tells him everyone doesn't care that he is a Grimwalker, and that he is one of them now, but Hunter is shown to be sad over the fact, leading Willow to leave the room distraught. Gus reveals he knew Hunter's identity ever since the Day of Unity and questions if his and Hunter's decision of waiting was the right call as he goes to find Willow, with Hunter realize that his fear and not trusting them became a mistake and quickly following. Boscha taunts Willow like so many prior times, causing her to stand up for herself and briefly admit her stress. The taunt is revealed to be a trap, and Willow and the rest of the group are ambushed and captured by Boscha and Kikimora, who, with her Abomatron, had been posing as a refugee and became Boscha's advisor.

Belos heads to the Archive House and possesses the puppet of Raine Whispers. The Collector finds him, but Belos convinces him that he was magically brought back to life and that King is currently plotting to violently rebel against him; the Collector eavesdrops on King, Eda, and Lilith, and believes the idea to be true, not hearing King's true intentions to talk with him peacefully.

Luz, Amity, Camila, and Mattholomule end up in a pit. Kikimora, wanting revenge on Luz, decides to attack the group with her Abomatron, sending the four fleeing in different directions. Amity and Mattholomule end up running into Boscha, who pleads with Amity to join the leadership council. Amity is disgusted by the offer and refuses to take it. Meanwhile, Luz and Camila retreat into the local woods, where Luz is frustrated about messing up again, and admits she does not want to leave the Demon Realm. Camila reminds her that messing up is a part of life, relating all her mistakes, and apologizing for her greatest one: trying to change Luz into someone she wasn't. Luz realizes that all she wanted was to be understood, causing her palisman egg to finally hatch. In another pit, Willow, Gus, and Hunter end up wandering around. Willow suffers an extreme nervous breakdown, losing control of her magic. Hunter and Gus manage to calm her down, with the former unlocking the magic of Flapjack's spirit inside of him, allowing him to perform magic without a staff. They let Willow vent about her frustrations, and Hunter admits to her how important the group is to him. As the pit caves in, the three escape and regroup with Luz and Camila, who are being attacked by Kikimora. Amity, now joined by Boscha and the rest of the students at Hexside, join in the fight and overrun Kikimora. With this, Luz's group decides to head to the Titan's skull, where Luz's palisman is discovered to be a serpentine shape-shifter, or "snakeshifter", she names Stringbean. The Collector looks on with disgust, as Belos' words convince him that Luz has come to assist King in defeating him, he declares that he wants to play a "new game", and snaps his fingers.

Promotion 
On January 5, a promotional poster was released on show creator Dana Terrace's social media accounts. Writer Jade King speculated that the Boiling Isles had been left somewhat intact, along with speculating that Luz and Camila had newfound motivation.

Release 
The episode officially premiered on January 21, 2023, on both Disney Channel and Disney XD. However, the full episode was leaked two weeks earlier on January 5, when video on demand service iTunes Canada had accidentally released the episode, leading to the episode being downloaded by users who had purchased the episode, who then proceeded to spread the episode across social media. A similar instance had happened with the Amphibia episode "True Colors".  In a series of now-deleted tweets, show creator Dana Terrace expressed frustration at The Walt Disney Company and iTunes for the leak, saying "I’m so fucking tired... when your own damn company just uploads shit by accident."

Critical reception 
Jade King, writer for TheGamer, would praise the episode for its emotional and narrative weight. Jermall Keels, writer for Comic Book Resources, praised how the episode showed the effects of isolation. Heather Hogan, writer for Autostraddle, praised how the episode was able to give almost all of the main characters one final character arc before the finale. Avani Goswami, writer for The Pop Break, wrote that "'For the Future' is done incredibly well in that it gives us character development – like Willow allowing herself to feel her emotions – and grows relationships, like Willow and Hunter's budding romance. It also explores the idea that the Collector, despite the pain he has caused, is not all evil and is also just a child." Jeff Levene, writer for The Escapist, wrote that "For as few resources as the Owl House team was given to wrap up the show, 'For the Future' is as perfect as it needs to be."

References

External links 
 

The Owl House episodes
2023 American television episodes
Amputees in fiction
Dolls in fiction
Fiction about shapeshifting
Fratricide in fiction
Grief in fiction
Television episodes about cloning
Television episodes about demons
Television episodes about spirit possession
Television episodes set in schools
Works about games